Newtown Savings Bank, is a full-service community bank and mortgage provider serving customers in Connecticut. The bank is headquartered in Newtown, Connecticut and was founded in 1855.

History
The bank was founded in 1855 under its current name, and was the 23rd savings institution founded in Connecticut. The bank has 15 locations, and owns the subsidiary Newtown Investment Services Inc., which it founded in 1995. In 2016, the bank's regional lending center opened in the town of Hamden, Connecticut. In 2016, the bank filed to become a holding company.

Notes

External links
 Official website
 Newtown Investment Services Inc.

Banks based in Connecticut
Banks established in 1855
Mutual savings banks in the United States
Mortgage lenders of the United States
Companies based in Fairfield County, Connecticut
1855 establishments in Connecticut